Fukao (written: 深尾) is a Japanese surname. Notable people with the surname include:

, Japanese socialist and educator
, Japanese jazz singer
, Japanese volleyball player

Japanese-language surnames